Lim Kim San  (30 November 1916 – 20 July 2006) was a Singaporean politician who served as a Cabinet minister between 1965 and 1981. He was credited for leading a successful public housing programme in the country during the early 1960s, which eased the acute housing shortage problem at that time.

Early life and education
Born in 1916 in Singapore, Lim was the eldest of six children. He was educated at Oldham Hall School and Anglo-Chinese School before graduating from Raffles College in 1939 with a Diploma in Arts in economics.

During the Japanese occupation, Lim was one of the many tortured on suspicion of being pro-communist and pro-British. 

A long time after the war, Lim said that those who survived the horror and the brutality of the Japanese occupation "will never forget them." Lim also said that the traumatic and humiliating experience, politicised his generation and made them vow to "never let our fate be decided by others."

Political career
Lim contested in Cairnhill as a PAP candidate during the 1963 general election and won 7,749 out of the 11,659 votes. He was subsequently appointed Minister for National Development. 

In recognition of Lim's adept ability of judging a person's merits, he was also brought on board as the PAP's "talent scout".

After Singapore's independence in 1965, Lim served as Minister for Finance between 1965 and 1967 and Minister for Interior and Defence between 1967 and 1970 before he was appointed Chairman of the Public Utilities Board to oversee the development of new water reservoirs, where he served between 1971 and 1978. 

Thereafter, he returned to the Cabinet and served as Minister for Environment between 1972 and 1975 and again between 1979 and 1981, Minister for Communications between 1975 and 1978, and Minister for National Development between 1978 and 1979.

Civil career 
In 1959, Lim was a member of the Public Service Commission and later became the deputy Chairman.

After retiring from politics in 1980, Lim remained active in public life for the rest of his life. Lim served as Chairman of the Port of Singapore Authority between 1979 and 1994. Under his stewardship, Singapore had become the busiest port in the world.

Lim was also Chairman of the Council of Presidential Advisers between 1992 and 2003.

Business career 
Lim made his first million at age of 36 when he came up with a machine to produce sago pearls cheaply.

In 1988, Lim was appointed Executive Chairman of the Board of Singapore Press Holdings, but only accepted on the condition that he was given executive powers. He restructured the company and upgraded the printing presses with full color capabilities and a new press centre.

Personal life
Lim married Pang Gek Kim ​in 1939 and they had five children. Pang died in 1994.

Lim died at approximately 5:30pm Singapore Standard Time (UTC+08:00) on 20 July 2006 at his home after prolonged illness. He was cremated at Mandai Crematorium. As a mark of respect for Lim's contributions to the country, State flags at all Government buildings were flown at half-mast on the day of his funeral.

Legacy

Housing Development Board
In 1960, Lim was appointed Chairman of the Housing Development Board. Due to a rapidly increasing population, more than 400,000 people were either living in over-crowded conditions in ramshackle “shophouse” buildings or in squatter settlements with substandard living conditions. At this time, Lim was appointed to the Housing Development Board (HDB).

Lim had volunteered for the job and was not paid for three years. It was in this position that Lim oversaw the massive construction of high-rise, low-cost apartments that would eventually become the main source of housing for Singaporeans.

Housing Plan

Lim was known for his organising and planning abilities. He forgo a detailed planning stage and instead chose a "rough and ready" approach to work fast using rough estimates of the housing requirement. In the first two years of this crash program, over 2000 units were built, more than what was built in the previous decade.

Lim defied all detractors, in particular those in the Singapore Improvement Trust, who said he could not build 10,000 units a year. A committee was eventually set up under Lim Tay Boh to find out whether the HDB had the capability and the materials to reach the construction goal. By the time the committee published its report, the HDB had already completed 10,000 units of housing.

In the first Five Year Housing Program, HDB achieved its goal of completing 5,000 units of housing by 1965. The largest project at that time was Queenstown, a satellite town of more than 17,500 flats capable of housing close to 22,000 people. The new neighborhood was built as a self-contained entity, with all amenities and shops built along with the houses, so people would not need to travel to other areas for basic necessities, thereby lowering traffic congestion. This philosophy—which was ultimately extended with the concept of regional centre, is generally accredited by many to have significantly contributed to the lower rate of congestion and burden on the central business district than before.

In May 1961, the Bukit Ho Swee Fire broke out and some 16,000 people became homeless. Under Lim's guidance, the relocation and reconstruction of the lost housing was completed in just over four years, and 1200 housing flats were made available to those who lost their homes in the fire.

The success of the housing project was considered by some to stem mainly from the standardised architectural designs that were used. Another important factor was Lim's decision to use private contractors rather than employing construction workers directly. This had allowed the HDB to supervise the contractors to ensure standards, rather than dealing with minute problems. The overall cost was also kept low by using a large pool of contractors and different sources of building materials.

There are some who said that by solving Singapore's housing problem, Lim saved the People's Action Party (PAP) in the process. However, Lim was more than modest, saying the success of the housing programme was also due to government funding, as housing was, and still is, a top priority.

Part of Lim's success at the HDB was that he had the trust of Prime Minister Lee Kuan Yew. He also worked closely with the Minister for Finance Goh Keng Swee. These connections allowed Lim to keep the housing program well-funded. Another political factor that allowed the success of the Housing Project was that Lim managed to cut through bureaucratic red tape and rigid regulations that would have otherwise hindered the housing programme.

Honours
In June 1962, Lim was awarded the Order of Temasek (First Class), Singapore's highest civilian honour. 

In August 1965, he was awarded the Ramon Magsaysay Award for his community leadership.

References

1916 births
2006 deaths
Members of the Parliament of Singapore
Members of the Dewan Rakyat
Members of the Legislative Assembly of Singapore
Singaporean people of Chinese descent
People's Action Party politicians
Members of the Cabinet of Singapore
Anglo-Chinese School alumni
Recipients of the Darjah Utama Temasek
Ministers for Defence of Singapore
Finance ministers of Singapore
Environment ministers of Singapore
Ministers for Education of Singapore
Communications ministers of Singapore